Four Weddings is an Australian programme, based on the UK version of the same name. The series is narrated by Fifi Box and produced by Granada Media Australia for the Seven Network.

The first season follows a similar style as Come Dine with Me Australia and involves four brides attending each other's weddings and rating them on their Dress, Ceremony, Food and Reception out of thirty marks. The second season features an altered format, with the guest brides rating the other weddings out of ten marks for the whole event.

At the end of each episode they discover which of the couples has won a luxury honeymoon. First series couples won their honeymoon from the company Elegant Resorts & Villas, whilst second series winners won their honeymoon from company Coral Seas.

Episode guide

Series 1

Episode 1

Episode 2

Episode 3

Episode 4

Episode 5

Ratings

Series 1

References

External links
Four Weddings Australia - Official Four Weddings Australia Website
"Elegant Resorts & Villas Honeymoon prize supplier for Four Weddings" – "Website of Elegant Resorts & Villas "

Seven Network original programming
2010s Australian reality television series
2010 Australian television series debuts
2010 Australian television series endings
Wedding television shows
Television series by ITV Studios